Dietmar Elyashevich Rosenthal was a Russian linguist.

Rosenthal created several Russian-Italian dictionaries and also translated the works of Italian writers into Russian. Together with Prof. Bylinsky he introduced practical stylistics. He is most famous for the creation of multiple guidebooks and dictionaries of the Russian language.

Moscow State University alumni
Linguists from Russia
20th-century linguists
1900 births
1994 deaths